Psyrassaforma is a genus of beetles in the family Cerambycidae, containing the following species:

 Psyrassaforma janzeni Chemsak, 1991
 Psyrassaforma nitida Chemsak, 1991

References

Elaphidiini